Göran Bjerendal (born 21 October 1951) is a Swedish archer. He competed at the 1980, 1984, 1988 and the 1996 Summer Olympics.

References

1951 births
Living people
Swedish male archers
Olympic archers of Sweden
Archers at the 1980 Summer Olympics
Archers at the 1984 Summer Olympics
Archers at the 1988 Summer Olympics
Archers at the 1996 Summer Olympics
Sportspeople from Gothenburg
20th-century Swedish people
21st-century Swedish people